The Team 'Aero Kickboxing with Step' category involved four teams representing four countries all based in Europe.  Each team went through five performances (1.5 to 2 minutes each) with the totals added up at the end of the event.  The gold medal winner was Team Hungary, Team Portugal claimed silver and Team Croatia claimed bronze.

Results

See also
List of WAKO Amateur World Championships
List of WAKO Amateur European Championships
List of male kickboxers
List of female kickboxers

References

External links
 WAKO World Association of Kickboxing Organizations Official Site

Kickboxing events at the WAKO World Championships 2007 Coimbra
2007 in kickboxing
Kickboxing in Portugal